The Wieting Theater is located in Toledo, Iowa, United States.  Ella W. Wieting had three opera houses built as memorials to her husband,
C.W. Wieting.  The Wietings came to Toledo in 1867 from Worcester, New York.  He was trained as a dentist, and was involved in other business ventures.  They moved to Syracuse, New York around 1900, and he died there in 1906. She had the opera houses built in the three communities where they lived.  The theater in Toledo housed productions from travelling road shows, local school productions, political meetings, movies, and lyceum courses. The theater closed in 1958, and reopened two years later by the Wieting Theatre Guild.  It was listed on the National Register of Historic Places in 1979.

Completed in 1912, the two-story brick structure measures .  The Colonial Revival style facade features a brick parapet, columned porch, and a Palladian window.  The interior contains an auditorium, balcony, stage, dressing rooms, and an orchestra pit.

References

External links
Theatre website

Theatres completed in 1912
Colonial Revival architecture in Iowa
Buildings and structures in Tama County, Iowa
Toledo, Iowa
National Register of Historic Places in Tama County, Iowa
Theatres on the National Register of Historic Places in Iowa